Ovidiu Nicolae Iacov (18 July 1981 – 21 December 2001) was a Romanian footballer. During his career he played only for Steaua București.

He debuted in Divizia A on 9 June 2000, in Mediaş, scoring a goal in a 3–1 win for his team, Steaua. This was to be his only goal scored in Divizia A, in 4 matches played.

Iacov died in a car accident when his Volkswagen crashed into a concrete sidewall near Valea Voievozilor, Târgoviște. Iacov was found to have been driving under the influence of alcohol, without a licence, late at night. Three other players from Chindia Târgoviște were riding with him on the back seats, but they all escaped with minor injuries. The driver's girlfriend, in the passenger seat, also died.

References

1981 births
2001 deaths
Romanian footballers
Liga I players
FC Steaua București players
Road incident deaths in Romania
Association football midfielders
People from Dâmbovița County